Uzbekistan had a total primary energy supply (TPES) of 48.28 Mtoe in 2012. Electricity consumption was 47.80 TWh. 
The majority of primary energy came from fossil fuels, with natural gas, coal and oil the main sources. Hydroelectricity, the only significant renewable source in the country, accounted for about 2% of the primary energy supply. 
Natural gas is the source for 73.8% of electricity production, followed by hydroelectricity with 21.4%.

Uzbekistan will be the first country in Central Asia to develop and produce solar energy by Uzbekenergo a state owned energy company. The Samarkand region was picked along with six other regions being inspected. The solar power plant is to have a capacity of 100 megawatts.

List of power stations

References